The 2015 FIBA CBC Championship for Women (a FIBA-sponsored international basketball tournament where national teams from the Caribbean participate) was held in the city of Road Town, British Virgin Islands from June 8 to June 12, 2015. The results are given here.

Group stage

Group A

Group B

Final round

Classification 5-8

Semifinals

Final classification games

Seventh place game

Fifth place game

Third place game

Final

Final standings

References
FIBA Archive

2015 in women's basketball
2014–15 in North American basketball
2015 in British Virgin Islands sport
2015 in Caribbean sport
International basketball competitions hosted by the British Virgin Islands